In game theory, a non-cooperative game is a game with competition between individual players, as opposed to cooperative games, and in which alliances can only operate if self-enforcing (e.g. through credible threats). However, 'cooperative' and 'non-cooperative' are only technical terms to describe the theory used to model a game, so it is possible to use cooperative game theory to model competition and using non-cooperative game theory to model cooperation.

The key distinguishing feature is the absence of external authority to establish rules enforcing cooperative behavior.  In the absence of external authority (such as contract law), players cannot group into coalitions and must compete independently.

Negative-sum games and zero-sum games are both types of non-cooperative games.

Non-cooperative game theory in academic literature 
A mention of non-cooperative game theory was made in John Nash's 1951 article in the journal Annals of Mathematics. Nash Equilibrium, in fact, are often referred to as "non-cooperative equilibrium".

According to Tamer Başar in Lecture Notes on Non-Cooperative Game Theory, a non-cooperative game requires specifying:
 the number of players;
 the possible actions available to each player, and any constraints that may be imposed on them; 
 the objective function of each player which he or she attempts to optimise;
 any time ordering of the execution of the actions if the players are allowed to act more than once;
 any information acquisition that takes place and how the information available to a player at each point in time depends on the past actions of other players, and;
 whether there is a player (nature) whose action is the outcome of a probabilistic event with a fixed (known) distribution.

Assumptions 

 Perfect recall: each player remembers his/ her decisions and knowned information.
 Self-interest: each player does not consider the effect of actions on the others but only on his/ her own.
 Rational: each player is interested to maximise his/ her utility or payoff.
 Complete information: each player knows the preferences and strategies of the other players.
 Each player has the same understanding of how the game is.

Analysis 
Non-cooperative games are generally analysed through the framework of non-cooperative game theory, which tries to predict players' individual strategies and payoffs and to find Nash equilibria. This framework often requires a detailed knowledge in the possible actions and the levels of information of each player. It is opposed to cooperative game theory, which focuses on predicting which groups of players ("coalitions") will form, the joint actions that groups will take, and the resulting collective payoffs.  Cooperative game theory does not analyze the strategic bargaining that occurs within each coalition and affects the distribution of the collective payoff between the members.

Non-cooperative game theory provides a low-level approach as it models all the procedural details of the game, whereas cooperative game theory only describes the structure, strategies and payoffs of coalitions. Therefore, cooperative game theory is referred to as coalitional, and non-cooperative game theory is procedural. Non-cooperative game theory is in this sense more inclusive than cooperative game theory.
 
It is also more general, as cooperative games can be analyzed using the terms of non-cooperative game theory.
Where arbitration is available to enforce an agreement, that agreement falls outside the scope of non-cooperative theory: but it may be possible to state sufficient assumptions to encompass all the possible strategies players may adopt, in relation to arbitration. This will bring the agreement within the scope of non-cooperative theory. Alternatively, it may be possible to describe the arbitrator as a party to the agreement and model the relevant processes and payoffs suitably.

Accordingly, it would be desirable to have all games expressed under a non-cooperative framework.  But in many instances insufficient information is available to accurately model the formal procedures available to the players during the strategic bargaining process; or the resulting model would be of too high complexity to offer a practical tool in the real world. In such cases, cooperative game theory provides a simplified approach that allows analysis of the game at large without having to make any assumption about bargaining powers.

The difference between cooperative and non-cooperative game theory 
There is a distinction between cooperative game theory and non-cooperative game theory, which follows Nash's statement: “This (cooperative game) theory is based on an analysis of the interrelationships of the various coalitions which can be formed by the players of the game. Our (non-cooperative game) theory, in contradistinction, is based on the absence of coalitions in that it is assumed that each participant acts independently, without collaboration or communication with any of the others.”

Non-cooperative game theory models situations in which agents cannot reach a binding agreement that enforces some action on one another. This theory has winners and losers in each case, and yet agents may end up in Pareto-inferior outcomes, where every agent is worse off and there is an potential outcome for every agent to be better off. Agents will have to predict what their opponents will do. Cooperative game theory models situations in which a binding agreement is possible. In other words, the cooperative game theory  implies that agents cooperate to achieve a common goal and they are not necessarily referred to as a team because the correct term is the coalition. Each agent has its skills or contributions that provide strength to the coalition.

Further, it has been supposed that non-cooperative game theory is purported to analyse the effect of independent decisions on society as a whole. In comparison, cooperative game theory focuses only on the effects of participants in a certain coalition, when the coalition attempts to improve the collective welfare.

Solutions 
Solutions in non-cooperative game are similar to all other games in game theory, but without the ones involved binding agreements enforced by the external authority. The solutions are normally based on the concept of Nash equilibrium, and these solutions are reached by using methods listed in Solution concept. Most solutions used in non-cooperative game are refinements developed from Nash equilibrium, including the minimax mixed-strategy proved by John von Neumann.

Examples 
Strategic games are also a form of non-cooperative game theory, where only the available strategies and combinations of options are listed to produce outcomes.

Rock-paper-scissors 

The simple example is the game of rock-paper-scissors. In the game of rock-paper-scissors, there is no cooperative option between the two players available: if Player 1 plays "rock", it is in Player 2's interest to play "paper"'; if Player 2 plays "paper", it is in Player 1's interest to play "scissors"; if Player 1 plays "scissors", it is in Player 2's interest to play "rock". The preference of the players is cyclical, and no cooperative outcome can be reached. This fails the transitive preference property.

Two children steal sweets 
Suppose a shopkeeper catches two children for stealing sweets. The two children spoke separately with the shop owner in the shop office. In this case, the children have only two options: to remain silent (neither child admits it) or to say that their peers stole the sweets. If one child admits to stealing the sweets and the other does not, the child who admits will receive a warning, and the other child will be punished for four weeks. If both children admit to stealing the sweets, they will both receive a two-week punishment. If they both deny it, then both children will be punished for three weeks. One child must rely on the idea of another child to avoid minor punishment. The connection between them is that game theory generally looks at how individuals or groups make choices that will affect other parties.

The two children's first thought must have been their interests, but this would have led to the most extended punishment for both. The best option for them is for them to both admit and punish for a fortnight. Thus, this is the Nash equilibrium, also called the non-cooperative equilibrium.

Prisoner's Dilemma 

Another example of a non-cooperative game is the well-known Prisoner's Dilemma game. The game involves two players, or defendants, who are kept in separate rooms and thus are unable to communicate. Players must decide, by themselves in isolation, whether to cooperate with the other player or to betray them and confess to law authorities. As shown in the diagram, both players will receive a higher payoff in the form of a lower jail sentence if they both remain silent. If both confess, they receive a lower payoff in the form of a higher jail sentence. If one player confesses and the other remain silent and cooperates, the confessor will receive a higher payoff, while the silent player will receive a lower payoff than if both players cooperated with each other.

The Nash equilibrium therefore lies where players both betray each other, in the players protecting oneself from being punished more.

The battle of the sexes game 

The game is about two players, boy and girl, deciding either going to a football game or going to an opera for their date, which respectively represent boy's and girl's preferred activity (i.e. boy prefers football game and girl prefers opera). This example is a two-person non-cooperative non-zerosum (TNNC) game with opposite payoffs or conflicting preferences. Because there are two Nash equilibria, this case is a pure coordination problem with no possibility of refinement or selection. Thus, the two players will try to maximise their own payoff or to sacrifice for the other and yet these strategy without coordination will lead to two outcomes with even worse payoffs for both if they have disagreement on what to do on their date.

See also 
 Mutual assured destruction
 Grim trigger
 Intra-household bargaining
 Proper equilibrium
 Tit for tat
 Trembling hand perfect equilibrium
 Trigger strategy
 War of attrition (game)

References

External links 

 A brief introduction to non-cooperative game theory

Mathematical and quantitative methods (economics)

it:Teoria dei giochi#Giochi non cooperativi